Josmar Jesús Zambrano Suárez (born 9 June 1992) is a Venezuelan professional footballer who plays for Aragua as an attacking midfielder.

Club career
Zambrano was born in San Cristóbal, Táchira. He finished his formation with CD Tenerife in Spain, signing his first professional contract on 25 August 2010 shortly after his 18th birthday.

Zambrano made his official debut for the Canary Islands side on 1 September 2010, coming on as a late substitute for Iriome González in a 1–4 away loss against Elche CF in the season's Copa del Rey. His first league appearance came the following month, as he played 12 minutes in a 1–3 defeat at FC Barcelona B in the Segunda División.

Zambrano's form for Tenerife's reserves attracted attention from bigger clubs such as FC Barcelona and Sevilla FC. Nothing came of it and, on 29 December 2011, he returned to his country and joined Zamora FC on loan.

Zambrano could not found his room in Tenerife's first team after his return, and he terminated his link on 18 January 2013. Four days later he signed with Recreativo de Huelva, being immediately loaned to CD San Roque de Lepe in Segunda División B.

On 30 December 2014, Zambrano cut ties with Recre and joined Deportivo La Guaira, being immediately loaned to Zulia FC also in Venezuela.

References

External links

1992 births
Living people
People from San Cristóbal, Táchira
Venezuelan footballers
Association football midfielders
Segunda División players
Segunda División B players
Tercera División players
CD Tenerife B players
CD Tenerife players
Atlético Onubense players
CD San Roque de Lepe footballers
Recreativo de Huelva players
Zamora FC players
Deportivo La Guaira players
Zulia F.C. players
Deportivo Táchira F.C. players
Metropolitanos FC players
Estudiantes de Caracas players
A.C.C.D. Mineros de Guayana players
Venezuela international footballers
Venezuelan expatriate footballers
Expatriate footballers in Spain
Venezuelan expatriate sportspeople in Spain